The Grammy Award for Best Ethnic or Traditional Folk Recording was awarded from 1960 to 1986. During this time the award had several minor name changes:

From 1960 to 1961 the award was known as Best Performance - Folk
From 1962 to 1967 it was awarded as Best Folk Recording
From 1968 to 1970 it was awarded as Best Folk Performance
In 1971 and from 1973 to 1974 the award was known as Best Ethnic or Traditional Recording (including traditional blues)
In 1972 and from 1975 to 1982  it was awarded as Best Ethnic or Traditional Recording
From 1983 to 1986 it was awarded as Best Ethnic or Traditional Folk Recording

In 1987 the award was split into two new awards: the Grammy Award for Best Traditional Folk Album and the Grammy Award for Best Contemporary Folk Album.

Years reflect the year in which the Grammy Awards were presented, for works released in the previous year.

Winners and nominees

Individuals with multiple wins

6 wins
 Muddy Waters

2 wins
 Harry Belafonte
 Peter, Paul and Mary
 John Hartford
 Doc Watson

References

 
Ethnic Or Traditional Folk Recording